One Tower is a residential supertall skyscraper on hold along the MIBC on Presnensky District in Moscow. Its height upon completion in 2024 will be  with 109 floors. It will be the tallest building in Moscow, and the second-tallest building in Russia and Europe after the Lakhta Center in Saint Petersburg. As a residential building, it will be the tallest in Europe and the second-tallest in the world after Central Park Tower in New York City. The One Tower will also be the first building in Europe with more than 100 floors above ground and will have Europe's highest observation deck on the 100th floor. 

According to recent media reports the construction cost will be 49 billion rubles (approx. $690 million as of July 2020).

Gallery

See also 
List of tallest buildings in Moscow
List of tallest buildings in Russia
List of tallest buildings in Europe

References

External links 
 Skyscraper's site at www.skuratov-arch.ru

Skyscrapers in Russia
Buildings and structures under construction in Russia